Romello Da'Quan White (born May 9, 1998) is an American professional basketball player for Ironi Nahariya of the Israeli Basketball National League and the Balkan League. He played college basketball for the Arizona State Sun Devils and the Ole Miss Rebels.

High school career
White attended Wheeler High School. He developed a relationship with former NBA player Jerry Stackhouse in high school, and Stackhouse became his mentor. White originally signed with Georgia Tech, but reconsidered after coach Brian Gregory was fired. He committed to Arizona State because he had a relationship with former assistant coach Anthony Coleman.

College career
White redshirted his true freshman season to improve his academics. He became a starter as a redshirt freshman and averaged 10.5 points and 7.1 rebounds per game. White averaged 8.7 points and 5.2 rebounds per game as a sophomore. He worked on his conditioning and nutrition in the offseason and lost 10 pounds. As a junior, White averaged 10.2 points and 8.8 rebounds per game, and posted eight double-doubles. 

Following the season, he transferred to Ole Miss. On February 6, 2021, he scored a career-high 30 points and had 10 rebounds and four blocks in an 86–84 win against Auburn. During his redshirt senior season, White averaged 11.4 points and 6 rebounds per game, led the team with 36 blocks, and set the Ole Miss single-season record with a 64.9 percent shooting percentage.

Professional career
On July 11, 2021, White signed his first professional contract with Hapoel Eilat of the Israeli Basketball Premier League. He averaged 10.7 points and 4.0 rebounds per game, but left the team in December 2021.

On March 6, 2022, White signed with Keravnos B.C. of the Cyprus Basketball Division A.

Career statistics

College

|-
| style="text-align:left;"| 2016–17
| style="text-align:left;"| Arizona State
| style="text-align:center;" colspan="11"|  Redshirt
|-
| style="text-align:left;"| 2017–18
| style="text-align:left;"| Arizona State
| 31 || 29 || 24.3 || .652 || – || .552 || 7.1 || .4 || .3 || .7 || 10.5
|-
| style="text-align:left;"| 2018–19
| style="text-align:left;"| Arizona State
| 34 || 32 || 25.0 || .598 || – || .579 || 5.2 || .3 || .4 || .7 || 8.7
|-
| style="text-align:left;"| 2019–20
| style="text-align:left;"| Arizona State
| 30 || 29 || 28.5 || .569 || – || .683 || 8.8 || 1.0 || .5 || 1.2 || 10.2
|-
| style="text-align:left;"| 2020–21
| style="text-align:left;"| Ole Miss
| 28 || 25 || 27.8 || .649 || .000 || .710 || 6.0 || 1.0 || .5 || 1.3 || 11.4
|- class="sortbottom"
| style="text-align:center;" colspan="2"| Career
| 123 || 115 || 26.3 || .616 || .000 || .624 || 6.7 || .7 || .4 || 1.0 || 10.1

References

External links
Ole Miss Rebels bio
Arizona State Sun Devils bio

1998 births
Living people
American men's basketball players
Arizona State Sun Devils men's basketball players
Basketball players from Atlanta
Hapoel Eilat basketball players
Keravnos B.C. players
Ole Miss Rebels men's basketball players
Power forwards (basketball)